Charles H. Harmon (died 1886) was the tenth vice president of Liberia from 3 January 1876 to 7 January 1878.

Biography 
Harmon immigrated to Liberia at age six. Soon after this, he was made an orphan. Harmon was converted to Methodism by minister Francis Burns.

Harmon was ordained a deacon in 1869, and was admitted to the Liberia Annual Mission Conference in 1872. He served as president of the Conference in 1879, 1880, and 1883.

Harmon served in the Legislature of Liberia for ten years. In 1875, he was elected vice president of Liberia under Republican President James Spriggs Payne, during Payne's second term in office. Payne and Harmon were sworn in on 3 January 1876. On 1 January 1878, Payne was suspended from office following an impeachment by the national legislature. Harmon served as acting president of Liberia for six days, until 7 January 1878 when Anthony W. Gardiner was sworn in as president.

Harmon died in 1886 in Cape Palmas.

References 

Year of birth missing
1886 deaths
Liberian Christians
Deacons
Americo-Liberian people
Vice presidents of Liberia
Republican Party (Liberia) politicians
19th-century Liberian politicians
19th-century Methodist ministers